The Texas Instruments Portable Professional Computer (TIPPC) is a portable version of Texas Instruments Professional Computer (TIPC), and are devices that were released on January 31, 1983. The TIPC is a desktop PC and the TIPPC is a fully compatible, portable version of the TIPC, and both machines were DOS-compatible, but not IBM PC compatible. Both computers were most often used by white-collar information workers and professionals who needed to gather, manipulate and transmit information. Texas Instruments (TI) was the first company to release videotape training videos for their computers.

Specifications 
The TI Professional Computer came with a 14", 720x300 pixel color monitor, had 512 KB RAM and contained state-of-the-art, cutting-edge features, including industry-standard software support, easy expandability, a superior and user-friendly QWERTY keyboard, and natural language database options.

The standard version of the TIPPC had a built-in 9" monochrome monitor; the upgraded version came with a built-in 9" color monitor. The graphical capabilities were far superior to the IBM competitor; the TIPPC featured a maximum resolution of 720x300 pixels. The standard device came equipped with 64 KB RAM but could be expanded to 768 KB.

The TI Portable Professional Computer was one of the first portable computers available with a built-in color screen (optional), and one of the first portable computers that could be connected to an Ethernet network, with the addition of one of 3Com's first Ethernet cards.

Additionally, both the TIPC and TIPPC were equipped with voice recognition software, allowing the user to speak basic commands to the computers. Both computers also featured an Ethernet card, a new device developed in 1983 by 3Com.

See also
 Texas Instruments Professional Computer

References

"OLD-COMPUTERS.COM : The Museum." OLD-COMPUTERS.COM : The Museum. Web. 7 Nov. 2014.
"Texas Instruments - 1983 TIPC and TI Professional Computer Introduced." Texas Instruments - 1983 TIPC and TI Professional Computer Introduced. Web. 7 Nov. 2014.

External links 
 http://bitsavers.trailing-edge.com/pdf/ti/professional/2223216-001_TIPC_Technical_Reference_Manual_Preliminary_012183.pdf

Professional Portable Computer
Portable computers